The Campeonato Brasileiro de Seleções Estaduais was a Brazilian football tournament contested by state teams. It was Brazil's most important football competition until the 1950s. Its last edition was played in 1987, when the CBF tried to revive the competition.

Winners and goalscorers

Notes
 Until 1960, Rio de Janeiro city was the Distrito Federal (Federal District). After that year, a new capital was founded, and Rio de Janeiro became the state of Guanabara, its capital and only municipality being Rio de Janeiro city. In 1975, Guanabara and the Rio de Janeiro state, whose capital was Niterói, merged as Rio de Janeiro, with Rio de Janeiro city as the capital.
 Two different Campeonato Brasileiro de Seleções Estaduais editions were contested in 1934. The professional competition was organized by the FBF (Federação Brasileira de Futebol) while the amateur competition was organized by the CBD (Confederação Brasileira de Desportos). São Paulo won the professional competition while Bahia won the amateur one.
 Two different Campeonato Brasileiro de Seleções Estaduais editions were contested in 1935. The professional competition was organized by the FBF (Federação Brasileira de Futebol) while the amateur competition was organized by the CBD (Confederação Brasileira de Desportos). Rio de Janeiro (Distrito Federal) won both competitions.

Statistics

References

Defunct football competitions in Brazil